Irmo is a town in Lexington and Richland counties, South Carolina, United States and a suburb of Columbia. The population of Irmo was 11,097 at the 2010 census.

History
Irmo was chartered on Christmas Eve in 1890 in response to the opening of the Columbia, Newberry and Laurens Railroad. The name of Irmo was the result of combining the names of Captain C.J. Iredell and Henry Moseley, two important figures in the founding of the town. Despite the town's growth, Irmo does not have an actual downtown area.  Rather, it consists of several clusters of suburban neighborhoods and commercial areas. 

The Jacob Wingard Dreher House was listed on the U.S. National Register of Historic Places in 1983.

Geography

Demographics

2020 census

As of the 2020 United States census, there were 11,569 people, 4,686 households, and 3,327 families residing in the town.

2000 census
As of the census of 2000, there were 11,039 people, 3,911 households, and 3,163 families residing in the town. The population density was 2,670.2 people per square mile (1,032.0/km2). There were 4,066 housing units at an average density of 983.5 per square mile (380.1/km2). The racial makeup of the town was 76.76% White, 20.16% African American, 0.25% Native American, 1.43% Asian, 0.08% Pacific Islander, 0.44% from other races, and 0.88% from two or more races. Hispanic or Latino of any race were 1.42% of the population.

There were 3,911 households, out of which 47.7% had children under the age of 18 living with them, 65.9% were married couples living together, 12.0% had a female householder with no husband present, and 19.1% were non-families. 15.4% of all households were made up of individuals, and 2.6% had someone living alone who was 65 years of age or older. The average household size was 2.81 and the average family size was 3.15.

In the town, the population was spread out, with 30.7% under the age of 18, 6.6% from 18 to 24, 34.6% from 25 to 44, 23.3% from 45 to 64, and 4.8% who were 65 years of age or older. The median age was 34 years. For every 100 females, there were 93.6 males. For every 100 females age 18 and over, there were 88.7 males.

The median income for a household in the town was $55,847, and the median income for a family was $62,005. Males had a median income of $41,054 versus $30,171 for females. The per capita income for the town was $22,312. About 3.3% of families and 4.3% of the population were below the poverty line, including 4.4% of those under age 18 and 11.6% of those age 65 or over.

Arts and culture

The Okra Strut is an annual festival started in 1973 as a fundraising effort for a new library.  Named for the okra plant, events have included a charity golf tournament, street dance, live entertainment, a midway, cycling and running competitions, arts and crafts exhibits, and a parade.

Government
The town council of Irmo consists of five council members including the mayor. The council also appoints a town administrator to efficiently operate the town government and manage day-to-day operations of the town. As of February 2020, the current mayor of Irmo is Barry A. Walker Sr., elected in 2019.

Education
Irmo has two public libraries, a branch of the Lexington County Public Library and a branch of the Richland County Public Library.

Irmo Elementary serves grades K-5.

Crossroads Intermediate School serves grade 6.

Irmo Middle School serves grades 6-8.

Irmo High School serves grades 9-12.

Dutch Fork Middle School serves grades 7-8

Dutch Fork High School serves Grades 9-12.

Notable people
 Tyler Bass (born 1997) NFL Kicker, attended Dutch Fork High School
 Ben Bridwell (born 1978), musician
 Alaina Coates (born 1995), professional basketball player for the Chicago Sky
 Leeza Gibbons (born 1957), talk show host
 Dustin Johnson (born 1984), professional golfer; attended Dutch Fork High School
 B.J. McKie (born 1977), professional basketball player University of South Carolina 
 Courtney Shealy (born 1977), swimmer, 2000 Olympic Gold Medalist
 E. Lee Spence (born 1947), pioneer underwater archaeologist and shipwreck historian
 Auden Tate (born 1997), NFL wide receiver for the Atlanta Falcons

References

External links
 
 Greater Irmo Chamber of Commerce

Towns in South Carolina
Towns in Lexington County, South Carolina
Towns in Richland County, South Carolina
Columbia metropolitan area (South Carolina)
Populated places established in 1890
1890 establishments in South Carolina